Final Approach is a 2008 American made-for-television action-thriller film featuring an ensemble cast led by Dean Cain as disgraced FBI hostage negotiator Jack Bender. The film premiered on Hallmark Channel on May 24, 2008.

Plot summary
Jack Bender (Dean Cain) suddenly finds himself in a hostile situation as a group of highly trained and well-armed terrorists, led by Greg Gilliad (Anthony Michael Hall), seize the airplane on which he is traveling, a Lockheed L-1011 of Infinity Air Flight 732 from Newark International Airport to LAX.  Bender must re-immerse himself into a world he thought he left behind forever.

Cast
 Dean Cain as Jack Bender
 Anthony Michael Hall as Greg Gilliad
 Ernie Hudson as Agent Dawson
 Lea Thompson as Alicia Bender
 Shailene Woodley as Maya Bender
 Sunny Mabrey as Sela Jameson
 William Forsythe as Silas Jensen
 Barry Livingston as Brian Fields
 Judith Hoag as Marie Gilford
 Stacy Haiduk as Alexa Windom

Reception 
The film, as of March 2016, holds a 0% rating with critics not critiquing and the audience rates the program as 100% favorable on Rotten Tomatoes.

References

External links
 Final Approach at Hallmark Channel
 
 

2007 television films
2007 films
2007 action thriller films
American aviation films
Action television films
American thriller television films
Films about terrorism
Hallmark Channel original films
Films directed by Armand Mastroianni
2000s American films